Nirbhaya is an Indian Bengali language drama film which is written and directed by Anshuman Pratyush. The film is produced by Amrik Entertainment Space and Pratyush Productions. The film stars are Gaurav Chakrabarty, Priyanka Sarkar, Sabyasachi Chakrabarty, Sreelekha Mitra and Shantilal Mukherjee in key roles. The film was released on 12 November 2021.

Cast
 Hiya Dey as Piyali
 Gaurav Chakrabarty as Hrithik Dutt
 Priyanka Sarkar as Aratrika Dutt
 Shantilal Mukherjee as Ritobrato 
 Sreelekha Mitra as Volunteer worker
 Sabyasachi Chakrabarty as Justice

Soundtrack

References

External links
 

2021 films
Bengali-language Indian films
2020s Bengali-language films
Indian drama films